Utah State Route 183 may refer to:

 Utah State Route 183 (1935-1969), a former state highway in Ogden, Utah, United States, that connected Utah State Route 235 (Washington Boulevard/North 400 East) with the State Industrial School in Ogden (now known as the Ogden-Weber Technical College) along AVC Lane (now Tech College Drive)
 Utah State Route 183A (1939-1963), East 700 North, a former state highway in Ogden, Utah, United States, that connected Utah State Route 235 (Washington Boulevard/North 400 East) with the Utah State Tuberculosis Sanatorium (now the campus of the Utah Schools for the Deaf and Blind)

See also

 List of state highways in Utah
 List of highways numbered 183

External links

 Utah Department of Transportation Highway Resolutions: Route 183 & Route 183A (PDF)